Stéphane Richer may refer to:

 Stéphane Richer (ice hockey defenceman) (born 1966), Canadian ice hockey defenceman
 Stéphane Richer (ice hockey forward) (born 1966), Canadian ice hockey forward